Broadcast and Multicast Service (BCMCS) is an interface for providing broadcast and multicast services in 3GPP2 CDMA2000 mobile networks. BCMCS can be used to transfer light video and audio clips or other data to a large group of mobile subscribers in an efficient manner. To do so, BCMCS is a so-called point-to-multipoint service. This means that multiple users receive the same information using the same radio resources.

Usage of BCMCS 
BCMCS can be used for two different kind of services. Broadcast services in which all users within the broadcasting area can receive the same information and a multicast services in which only users that have subscribed to the service can receive the information 
Although BCMCS can be used for mobile TV, it has some limitations in the capacity that can be used for this kind of services within the network.

Enhanced Broadcast and Multicast Services 
EBCMCS is an enhanced version of BCMCS. EBCMCS uses a new radio interface based on OFDM to combat problems with echoes (multipath) in the transmission.

See also
 Multimedia Broadcast Multicast Service (MBMS), a point-to-multipoint service defined for 3GPP systems

References
 .

External links
 

Broadcasting
Telecommunications